In Greek mythology, Theia ; , also rendered Thea or Thia) is the name of one of the three thousand Oceanid nymphs, daughters of Oceanus and Tethys, and the mother of the Cercopes. She is not to be confused with Theia, sister to Oceanus and Tethys and mother of Helios, Selene and Eos.

Mythology 
The Oceanid nymph Theia became the mother of the Cercopes, two mischievous impish thieves, by her own father Oceanus. When her sons stole from the hero Heracles, he seized and bound them and was about to kill them; Theia begged him to let her sons go. They were then transformed into either monkeys or stone.

See also 

 List of Oceanids
 Niobe
 Leto

Notes

References 
 
 
 

Oceanids
Greek goddesses
Sea and river goddesses